Tutlar (Dittaşka) is a rural locality (a selo) in Adilotarsky Selsoviet, Khasavyurtovsky District, Republic of Dagestan, Russia. The population was 505 as of 2010. There are 14 streets.

Geography 
Tutlar is located 39 km north of Khasavyurt (the district's administrative centre) by road. Adilotar is the nearest rural locality.

References 

Rural localities in Khasavyurtovsky District